William IV of Toulouse ( 1040 – 1094) was Count of Toulouse, Margrave of Provence, and Duke of Narbonne from 1061 to 1094. He was the son of Pons of Toulouse and Almodis de la Marche. He was married to Emma of Mortain, daughter of Robert, Count of Mortain, who gave him one daughter, Philippa.

Life
William married twice, and produced two legitimate sons; neither, however, survived infancy, leaving daughter Philippa as his heiress. As Toulouse had no precedent of female inheritance, this raised a question with regard to succession. In 1088, when William departed for the Holy Land, he left his brother, Raymond of Saint-Gilles, to govern in his stead (and, it was later claimed, to succeed him). Within five years, William was dead, and Raymond took power – although, after Philippa married William IX of Aquitaine, they laid claim to Toulouse and fought, off and on, for years to try to reclaim it from Raymond and his children.

He was the great-grandfather of Eleanor of Aquitaine, by his daughter's marriage to William IX of Aquitaine, and Eleanor's descendants continued to lay claim to Toulouse based on descent from William IV.

Notes

References

Sources

1040s births
1094 deaths
Counts of Toulouse
Margraves of Provence
Toulouse, William IV of
House of Rouergue